The Reform and Development Party is a Palestinian political party that is backed by Ashraf Jabari, Khader al-Jabari, Issa Allan, Khaldoun al-Husseini, Sharaf Ghanem and Nasser al-Tamimi.

References

2019 establishments in the State of Palestine
Palestinian political parties
Political parties established in 2019